Aquarello was a musical group which blended ambient music and jazz.  The trio included keyboardist Hans-Joachim Roedelius, based in Austria, and two Italian musicians, multi-instrumentalist Fabio Capanni, and saxophonist Nicola Alesini.  They were active between 1991 and 1998, recording and releasing three albums.

Overview

Core members
Hans-Joachim Roedelius (1991–1998)
Fabio Capanni (1991–1998)
Nicola Alesini (1991–1998)

Collaborators
Arlo Bigazzi - recorder, bass guitar, nature sounds, mixing.  Producer. (1992)
Laszlo von Ramhorst - percussion, bass, keyboards, harmonica, flute.  (1993)
Felix Jay - electric piano and keyboards. (1993)

History

The first  Aquarello album, Friendly Game, was released under the three artists' names but is listed as the debut Aquarello album in the discography on Roedelius' official website.  Fabio Capanni played a wide variety of instruments on the album, including electric and acoustic guitar, piano, synthesizer, marranzano, and bouzuki.  The trio were joined by Arlo Bigazzi on Friendly Game, who in addition to serving as producer, played recorder and bass.  He also co-wrote the song "Fiori" with Roedelius and Capanni and share arranger credits with the three members of Aquarello. Friendly Game was released by the Italian label Materiali Sonori in 1992.

Their second album To Cover the Dark, was their first release under the Aquarello name.  It was released in 1993 on the British Deep Wave label, the trio were joined by multi-instrumentalist Laszlo von Ramhorst and keyboardist Felix Jay.  von Ramhorst played percussion, bass, keyboards, harmonica, and flute on the album.

Aquarello's third, eponymous album was released in 1998 on the U.K.-based All Saints label.  It was the only album on which just the trio played with no additional musicians collaborating.  12 of the 14 tracks were recorded live at the Visual Music Festival VI in Lanzarote and most of this material are live versions of pieces which appeared on the first two albums.

Discography
1992 : Friendly Game (studio album, as Roedelius, Capanni, Alesini)
1993 : To Cover The Dark (studio album)
1998 : Aquarello (live album)

Notes

References
Alesini, Nicola MySpace: Nicola Alesini - IT - Jazz/Ambient
CD liner notes

Musical groups established in 1991
Italian jazz ensembles
1991 establishments in Italy
Italian jazz musicians